The men's 1960 United States Olympic trials for track and field for men were held at the Stanford Stadium at Stanford University in California, between July 1 and 2.   The 20 kilometer walk trials were held in Baltimore, Maryland, on July 17, and the 50 kilometer walk trials were held on July 3 in Pittsburgh, Pennsylvania. Two marathon trials were held between two races, the AAU National Championships in Yonkers, New York, on May 22 and the Boston Marathon in Boston, Massachusetts, on April 19.  As it turned out, the three selectees were the top 3 at Yonkers, but that is because Gordon McKenzie was also the first American finisher at Boston.

The 10,000 meters was held during a heat wave in Bakersfield, California on July 24-25.  Because of the temperatures, still  at midnight, the race began at 11:58 p.m. on the 24th so the bulk of the race took place technically on the 25th.  Several international athletes were allowed to participate in hopes of drawing the Americans to fast times, but the heat dashed those plans.  

The decathlon was held a week after the trials, allowing athletes to make attempts at individual events.  Rafer Johnson threw the javelin, Bob Gutowski tried to qualify in the pole vault, and Mike Herman attempted the long jump.  While Herman failed to get a legal attempt in the long jump, a week later his World Decathlon Best 26'3" would have chased Ralph Boston and certainly would have been good enough to qualify.  American resident, but Taiwanese citizen C. K. Yang was allowed to participate in the decathlon, where he pushed his college teammate Rafer Johnson to the world record, but his performance did not displace the American athletes in the trials. The process was organized by the AAU.

The women's Olympic trials were held separately in Abilene, Texas between July 15 and 16.

Men's results
Key:
.

Men track events

Men field events

Women's results

Women track events

Women field events

References

US Olympic Trials
Track, Outdoor
United States Summer Olympics Trials
Olympic Trials (track and field)
Olympic Trials (track and field)